George Joseph Maloof Sr. (April 11, 1923 – November 29, 1980) was an American heir and businessman of Lebanese descent.

Biography

Early life
George Joseph Maloof Sr. was born on April 11, 1923, in Las Vegas, New Mexico. His father, Joseph Maloof (1903-1957), an immigrant from Lebanon, was a Coors beer distributor in New Mexico.

Career
Taking over after his father suffered a heart attack in 1944, Maloof expanded the family's business into hotels, trucking and banking. He later became the owner of the Houston Rockets.

Personal life
He married Colleen Maloof. They had five children:
Adrienne Maloof
Phil Maloof
Joe Maloof
Gavin Maloof
George J. Maloof Jr.

Death
He died on November 29, 1980, at Presbyterian Hospital in Albuquerque, New Mexico. After his death, his sisters sued to force a liquidation of the family's holdings. Business Week estimated the family's net worth in 2000 to be more than $1 billion.

See also

 Maloof family

Notes

External links
 Maloof Family Biographies

1923 births
1980 deaths
American people of Lebanese descent
Houston Rockets owners
National Basketball Association executives
National Basketball Association owners
People from Las Vegas, New Mexico
20th-century American businesspeople